Bellechassagne is a commune of the Corrèze department in central France.

Geography
The river Diège forms part of the commune's western border.

Population

See also
Communes of the Corrèze department

References

Communes of Corrèze
Corrèze communes articles needing translation from French Wikipedia